Frederick William Allsopp (June 25, 1867 – April 9, 1946) was an author, newspaperman, book collector, and bookstore owner.

Biography
Allsopp was born in Wolverhampton, Staffordshire, England. At the age of twelve, his family moved to Prescott, in Nevada County. He sold newspapers during his youth and in 1884, he worked in the printing department of the Nevada County Picayune. At the age of seventeen, he applied for a job at the Arkansas Gazette in Little Rock, where by 1899, he became the business manager. Allsopp presided over the Arkansas Gazette for more than forty years.

Allsopp was an author and was co-owner of Allsopp & Chapple Bookstore in Little Rock. In 1922, he was named chairman of the 'Committee on a Code' of professional ethics of the Arkansas Press Association, and was later named APA historian "for life."

He built the Hotel Frederica designed by Theodore M. Sanders and named for his wife Mary Freiderica Chapple Allsopp.

Allsop died on April 9, 1946 and is buried in Little Rock's Mount Holly Cemetery. Allsopp Park, in Little Rock, is named in his honor.

Writings
Twenty years in a newspaper office  Central printing company, Little Rock, 1907
The life story of Albert Pike, Parke-Harper news service, Little Rock, 1920
History of the Arkansas Press for a Hundred Years and More 1922
Little Adventures in Newspaperdom 1922
Rhyneries 1924
Rimeries 1926
The Poets and Poetry of Arkansas by Fred W. Allsopp 1933
''Folklore of Romantic Arkansas (2 volumes; New York: The Grolier Society, 1931

References

External links

 Fred Allsop at Encyclopedia Of Arkansas
 
 

1867 births
1946 deaths
People from Prescott, Arkansas
Writers from Little Rock, Arkansas
American newspaper publishers (people)
British emigrants to the United States